Akampur is a village in Sumerpur block of Unnao district, Uttar Pradesh, India. As of 2011, its population is 2,107, in 380 households, and it has one primary school and no healthcare facilities.

The 1961 census recorded Akampur as comprising 2 hamlets, with a total population of 882 (478 male and 404 female), in 210 households and 180 physical houses. The area of the village was given as 1,231 acres, and it had a medical practitioner at the time. It had the following small industrial establishments at the time: 1 maker of miscellaneous wood products, 1 maker of earthenware pottery, 5 makers of sundry hardwares, and 2 makers of jewellery or precious metal objects.

References

Villages in Unnao district